Gary Lamb (born 20 May 1961) is a New Zealand diver. He competed in the men's 3 metre springboard event at the 1984 Summer Olympics.

References

External links
 

1961 births
Living people
New Zealand male divers
Olympic divers of New Zealand
Divers at the 1984 Summer Olympics
Sportspeople from Dunedin
Divers at the 1982 Commonwealth Games
Commonwealth Games competitors for New Zealand